The official coat of arms of the Republic of Costa Rica was designed in 1848, with modifications in 1906, 1964, and 1998.  The latest change was the addition of smoke to distinguish the three volcanoes.

Pre-1821 Colony of Spanish Empire 
Before 1821, Costa Rica was part of the Spanish Empire and did not have a local coat of arms. The arms of the reigning monarch were used instead. The only city that had a local coat of arms was the city of Cartago, awarded by King Phillip II in 1565. After independence from Spain in 1821, Costa Rica established different government boards trying to decide its future, debating between being independent (republicans) or join the Mexican Empire (imperialists). Lack of decision led to the Battle of Ochomogo on 5 April 1823, with the decision to remain independent and moving the capital city from Cartago to San José. Due to the long distances and difficult communication at the time, imperialists realized the Mexican Empire no longer existed since March 1823.

Federal and State Arms 
In March 1824, when Costa Rica joined the United Provinces of Central America arms promulgated by the new republic's constitution became the arms of the State of Costa Rica. This coat of arms consists of a triangle, in which five volcanoes rise out of the sea symbolizing the five member states of the United Provinces; above the volcanoes is a shining red Phrygian cap and a rainbow. This coat of arms with small changes is still used by the national coat of arms of El Salvador and Nicaragua.

On 2 November 1824, Costa Rica adopted its first coat of arms as a state within the federation which showed the right side of a naked male's chest and extended arm surrounded by a circle of green mountains and the legend free state of Costa Rica.

Arms of an Independent State 
In 1840, after Costa Rica's withdrawal from the federation, a new coat of arms was adopted, the first for Costa Rica as a sovereign and independent state. It consisted of an eight-pointed shining star in a blue field surrounded by a yellow circle with the legend State of Costa Rica. This coat of arms was suppressed in 1842 by Francisco Morazán during his failed bid to reunite the Federal Republic of Central America. The 1824 arms were used during this period.

Historical Coat of arms of the Republic

The basis of the current national coat of arms of Costa Rica was adopted 29 September 1848, during the presidency of Dr Jose Maria Castro Madriz together with the new flag. Both designs are attributed to Pacifica Fernandez, wife of Mr Castro Madriz. These arms were significantly modified by law number 18 of 27 November 1906, which eliminated the military symbols, national flags and horn of plenty contained in the 1848 design.

In 1964 two stars were added to the original five in order to complete seven, which by then was the number of provinces of the country. In 1848, when the original design was adopted the current provinces of Puntarenas and Limon had not reached that status.

On 5 May 1998, by Executive Decree No. 26853-SP, the coat of arms was given its current form, including the smoking volcanoes. Before this date, the three mountains did not show smoke coming out of their tops.

As officially described, the coat of arms represents: three volcanoes (one for each of the three mountain ranges in the country) and an extensive valley between two oceans (Pacific Ocean and Caribbean Sea) with a merchant ship in each one (representing the maritime history of the country). In the horizon a rising sun.  All are surrounded by a golden frame with golden beads (coffee). Two palms close the arms joined by a white ribbon with the motto "República de Costa Rica" in gold. An arch of seven stars represent the provinces of the republic. The arms are crowned by a blue ribbon with the motto "America Central".

See also
Flag of Costa Rica

References

External links
 

National symbols of Costa Rica
Costa Rica
Costa Rica
Costa Rica
Costa Rica
Costa Rica
Costa Rica
Costa Rica
Costa Rica